Colourscapes are large air-supported colour sculptures where Color is used to make an active space, to make a double edged space beyond measurement. Visitors to Colourscapes, wearing coloured cloaks, choose the journey they make through the interconnected chambers, becoming part of the sculpture, as the colour they wear changes as they move, dynamically altering the space that others see. Inside Colourscape, people are entirely surrounded by colour, which is transmitted from the inner surfaces as daylight filters through the plastic membrane from which Colourscape is made. This immersion in colour is an intense experience giving rise to interesting perceptual phenomena and emotional richness.

The first Colourscape was made in 1971 by Peter Jones, and since 1978 Lynne Dickens has collaborated with him. Their partnership (Cwmni Colourscape) has developed more complex and larger Colourscapes while experimenting with different ways of showing the structures. They began to explore the relationship between colour, sound and movement from 1977, collaborating with musicians, dancers and singers. Since 1971, 36 different Colourscapes have been made and shown all over the UK and in Ireland, Australia, Germany, Austria, Poland, Portugal, Romania, Belgium, Switzerland and Finland.

Colourscapes are hand-tailored from flexible vinyl sheet. They are part welded, using high frequency machines and part hand made, using liquid and other glues.

The largest Colourscape (Festival 1) was made in 1994/1995, as a commission from the Nettlefold Trust (later becoming EyeMusic Trust), by the directors Simon Desorgher and Lawrence Casserley. Previous to this, since 1989 Colourscapes had been used once a year by the Nettlefold Festival as a venue for performance, and from 1995 the Colourscape Music Festival was born and continues on Clapham Common and other places. The collaboration between Cwmni Colourscape and EyeMusic has also led to other commissions. The smallest Colourscapes are specifically created for schools workshops. In 2011, there are 6 Colourscapes in existence.

Over the years Colourscapes have been visited by thousands of people and Cwmni Colourscape now has a `social document` of visitors comments showing a shifting awareness of colour over the years. The belief that colour is powerful, capable of changing perception, stimulating creativity and that it is important to give people a harmonious and beautiful experience remains at the heart of Colourscapes` existence. Also that the form of Colourscapes made possible the installation in public places so being accessible to many.

References
 `Studio International` 1968 and 1972; Art and Australia 1981; `Link` 1983; `Golwg` 1990; `Wind` Japan 1996; `Art and Society`, Japan 1997;
 `Architekture Bauforum`, Austria 2000; `Jalouse`, France 2000; L`Architecture D`Aujourdhui, France 2001;
 `Being in Colour`, publication in `Into the Light`, a section of `Colour for Architecture Today` by Tom Porter and Byron Mikellides 2009.

Sculptures
Air-supported structures